Trichothyrsa is a genus of moths of the Heliodinidae family.

Species
Trichothyrsa bicolorella (Sauber 1902) (from Luzon)
Trichothyrsa coridarcha Meyrick, 1912   (from India)
Trichothyrsa flammivola  Meyrick 1912 (from India)
Trichothyrsa grypodes Meyrick, 1912   (from India)
Trichothyrsa pyrrhocoma  Meyrick, 1912 (from Sri Lanka)
Trichothyrsa taedifera  Meyrick, 1912 (from Sri Lanka)

References
Meyrick, E. (1912). Exotic Microlepid. 1 : 61
www.nhm.ac.uk Genus database

Heliodinidae
Moth genera